The decade of the 1130s in art involved some significant events.

Works
 1135: Illuminated manuscript Melisende Psalter published
 1135: The Illuminated manuscript Bury St Edmunds Bible by Master Hugo completed
 1130: Figure of the Prophet Jeremiah from the pillar of the portal of the Abbey of Saint-Pierre, Moissac, France

Births
 1130: Nicholas of Verdun – French goldsmith and enamellist of the Middle Ages (died 1205)

Deaths
 1135: Emperor Huizong of Song – Chinese emperor of the Song Dynasty who was also a skilled poet, painter, calligrapher, and musician (born 1082)
 1130: Li Tang – Chinese landscape painter (born 1050)

 
Art
Decades of the 12th century in art